The Middle River is a tributary of the Des Moines River in south-central Iowa in the United States. Via the Des Moines River, it is part of the watershed of the Mississippi River.

The Middle River rises in southwestern Guthrie County and initially flows southeastwardly through Adair County, then eastwardly through Madison County, then east-northeastwardly through Warren County, passing the towns of Casey, Winterset, Patterson, Bevington, Martensdale, Spring Hill and Carlisle. A substantial portion of the Middle River's course through Warren County has been straightened and channelized.

A short headwaters tributary of the river is known as the South Fork Middle River.

See also
List of Iowa rivers
Roseman Covered Bridge

References

External links
Middle River public access areas in Madison County
Iowa USGS Real-Time Statewide Streamflow Tables

Rivers of Iowa
Bodies of water of Adair County, Iowa
Bodies of water of Guthrie County, Iowa
Bodies of water of Madison County, Iowa
Bodies of water of Warren County, Iowa